Trimeresursus stejnegeri  is a species of venomous pit viper endemic to Asia. Two subspecies are currently recognized, including the nominate subspecies described here.

Common names for this pit viper include Stejneger's pit viper, Chinese pit viper, Chinese green tree viper, bamboo viper, Chinese bamboo pitviper, 69 bamboo viper, and Chinese tree viper.

Etymology
The specific name, stejnegeri, is in honor of Leonhard Stejneger, the Norwegian-born, American herpetologist who worked at the Smithsonian Institution for over 60 years.

Description

The males have hemipenes that are short and spinose beyond the bifurcation.

The dorsal scales are arranged in 21 longitudinal rows at midbody. There are 9–11 upper labials, of which the first are separated from nasal scales by a distinct suture. The supraoculars are single, narrow, and sometimes divided by a transverse suture. There are 11–16 scales in a line between the supraoculars. The ventrals number 150–174, and the subcaudals are 54–77. All of the subcaudals are paired.

The color pattern is bright to dark green above, pale green to whitish below, the two separated by a bright bicolored orange or brown (below) and white (above) (males) or bicolored or white only (females) ventrolateral stripe, which occupies the whole of the outermost scale row and a portion of the second row.

Bamboo vipers are carnivores: they eat small rodents, birds, frogs, and lizards.

Yellow colored mutants have been reported.

Common names
Common names for T. stejnegeri include bamboo viper, Chinese tree viper, bamboo snake, Chinese green tree viper, Chinese bamboo viper, Stejneger's pit viper, Stejneger's palm viper, red tail snake, Stejneger's bamboo pitviper,

Geographic range
Trimeresurus stejnegeri is found in Northeast India) and Nepal through Myanmar and Laos to much of southern China (Yunnan, Sichuan, Gansu, Jiangxi, Jiangsu, Hunan, Hubei, Guizhou, Guangxi, Guangdong, Hainan, Fujian, Anhui, Zhejiang), Vietnam, and Taiwan. The type locality was originally listed as "Shaowu, Fukien Province, China", and later emended to "N.W. Fukien Province" by Pope & Pope (1933) (Fukien being the former romanization of Fujian).

Habitat

Venom
Trimeresurus stejnegeri has a potent hemotoxin. The wound usually feels extremely painful, as if it had been branded with a hot iron, and the pain does not subside until about 24 hours after being bitten. Within a few minutes of being bitten, the surrounding flesh dies and turns black, highlighting the puncture wounds. The wound site quickly swells, and the skin and muscle become black due to necrosis. The size of the necrotic area depends on the amount of venom injected and the depth of the bite.

Reproduction
T. stejnegeri is viviparous.

Subspecies

References

Further reading

Creer S, Malhotra A, Thorpe RS, Chou WH (2001). "Multiple causation of phylogeographical pattern as revealed by nested clade analysis of the bamboo viper (Trimeresurus stejnegeri) within Taiwan". Molecular Ecology 10 (8): 1967-1981.
Das I (2002). A Photographic Guide to Snakes and other Reptiles of India. Sanibel Island, Florida: Ralph Curtis Books. 144 pp. . (Trimeresurus stejnegeri, p. 68).
Malhotra A, Thorpe RS (2004). "Maximizing information in systematic revisions: a combined molecular and morphological analysis of a cryptic green Pit Viper complex (Trimeresurus stejnegeri)". Biological Journal of the Linnean Society  82 (2): 219.
Parkinson CL (1999). "Molecular systematics and biogeographical history of Pit Vipers as determined by mitochondrial ribosomal DNA sequences". Copeia 1999 (3): 576–586.
Guo P, Zhang F (2001). "Comparative studies on hemipenes of four species of Trimeresurus (sensu stricto) (Serpentes: Crotalinae)". Amphibia-Reptilia 22 (1): 113-117.
Schmidt KP (1925). "New Reptiles and a New Salamander from China". American Museum Novitates (157): 1-5. ("Trimeresurus stejnegeri, new species", p. 4).
Tu M-C et al. (2000). "Phylogeny, Taxonomy, and Biogeography of the Oriental Pit Vipers of the Genus Trimeresurus (Reptilia: Viperidae: Crotalinae): A Molecular Perspective". Zoological Science 17: 1147–1157.

stejnegeri
Snakes of Asia
Reptiles of Cambodia
Snakes of China
Reptiles of India
Reptiles of Laos
Reptiles of Myanmar
Reptiles of Taiwan
Snakes of Vietnam
Taxa named by Karl Patterson Schmidt
Reptiles described in 1925